Marco Gaiardo (born 7 December 1970) is an Italian male mountain runner, who won a medal at individual senior level  at the World Mountain Running Championships.

Biography
Gaiardo won also four medals at individual senior level (two gold) and eight gold medals with the national team at the European Mountain Running Championships.

See also
 Italy at the World Mountain Running Championships
 Italy at the European Mountain Running Championships

References

External links
 

1970 births
Living people
Italian male mountain runners
Place of birth missing (living people)
21st-century Italian people